The Pramod Sawant Ministry came into existence on 19 March 2019. He was serving as the Speaker of the Goa assembly before being sworn in as Chief Minister, after the death of the sitting chief minister Manohar Parrikar.

Council of Ministers
The following is the list of the first Pramod Sawant Ministry.

Former Ministers

List of ministers (by date)

Third Council of Ministers (since 19 March 2019)

See also
 Third Manohar Parrikar Ministry

References

External links
 

Bharatiya Janata Party state ministries
Maharashtrawadi Gomantak Party
Goa Forward Party
Goa ministries
Cabinets established in 2019
2019 establishments in Goa